Gjorgji "Stanko" Čekovski (born December 11, 1979) is a Macedonian professional basketball player. He was also a member of the Macedonian national basketball team.

Macedonian national team 
Čekovski is also a member of the Macedonian national basketball team.  He competed with the team at Eurobasket 2011 and helped the team to a fourth-place finish, its best ever performance at the continental championship. In the group game against Greece, he was one of the heroes, scoring 11 points including three three-pointers and playing great defense to secure the win.

At the Eurobasket 2013, Čekovski suffered a muscle tear in the second game of the group stage against Lithuania, which was the end of the tournament for the power forward. Macedonia sorely missed Čekovski's presence, as the team ended in last place in the Group B.

Career statistics

Eurocup

|-
| style="text-align:left;"| 2004–05
| style="text-align:left;"| Lukoil Academic
| 12 || 11 || 29.3 || .425 || .414 || .471 || 5.1 || 0.8 || 0.8 || 0.0 || 8.8 || 7.3
|-
| style="text-align:left;"| 2005-06
| style="text-align:left;"| Lukoil Academic
| 11 || 10 || 25.1 || .439 || .341 || .846 || 4.2 || 0.5 || 1.6 || 0.1 || 8.8 || 7.6
|-
| style="text-align:left;"| 2004–05
| style="text-align:left;"| Lukoil Academic
| 10 || 10 || 28.2 || .430 || .383 || .400 || 5.5 || 0.7 || 1.0 || 0.1 || 9.2 || 6.1
|-
| style="text-align:left;"| 2013–14
| style="text-align:left;"| MZT Skopje Aerodrom
| 8 || 4 || 21.0 || .429 || .308 || .727 || 3.5 || 0.6 || 0.6 || 0.1 || 9.0 || 6.8

Domestic leagues

References

External links
Gjorgji Čekovski at aba-liga.com
Gjorgji Čekovski at euroleague.net
Gjorgji Čekovski at fiba.com

1979 births
Living people
ABA League players
BC Cherkaski Mavpy players
BC Levski Sofia players
BC Zaporizhya players
KB Prishtina players
KK MZT Skopje players
KK Rabotnički players
Macedonian men's basketball players
PBC Academic players
Power forwards (basketball)
Sportspeople from Skopje